Darreh Eshkaft-e Sarak (also Romanized as Darreh Eshkaft-e Sarāk; also known as Darreh Eshkaft) is a village in Howmeh-ye Sharqi Rural District, in the Central District of Izeh County, Khuzestan Province, Iran. At the 2006 census, its population was 109, in 18 families.

References 

Populated places in Izeh County